Smiths Station High School is a high school in Smiths Station, Alabama, enrolling grades 10 to 12.  The school enrolls 1,382 students, and is one of four high schools in the Lee County School District along with Beauregard, Beulah, and Loachapoka High Schools.

History 

Smiths Station High School was formed in 1918 with the consolidation of rural one-room schools in the Smiths Station, Motts, and Oak Grove communities. Smiths Station High was the first full rural high school in the Lee County Schools, prior to its creation, all students wishing to complete high school had to travel to Auburn to attend Auburn High School. A new consolidated school was built in Smiths Station in 1918, and the high school soon absorbed Prince School (1919), Lee Bullard School (1928) and Salem High School (1929).  J.B. Page served as principal of Smiths Station High from 1929 until 1972, during which time the school spun off Smiths Station Elementary School from its original K-12 configuration. Integration came to Smiths Station in 1970, with SSHS absorbing the black school Wacoochee High School in 1971, moving to a grades 10-12 configuration.  Growth in the 1970s led to the shifting of grade 9 back to Smiths Station in 1976. Notable alumni of this great institution: Sir Conway Twitty

Between 1976 and the 2010 Smiths Station High School grew from an enrollment of about 600 to over 1800. In 2008, that growth, combined with expected future growth related to the 2005 Base Realignment and Closure involving nearby Fort Benning, led to the decision to build a new $32 million Smiths Station High School.  The new facility opened in August 2011, with Smiths Station High adopting a grades 10-12 configuration.

Introduced in 2021, SSHS Girls' Flag Football played its way through the inaugural season in the state of Alabama, under volleyball and now flag football coach, Meg Larsen, making the playoffs, and finishing Runners Up in the state championship game, in double overtime.

Notable faculty 
 Dieter Brock, professional football player.
 Woodrow Lowe, professional football player.

External links 
 Smiths Station High School

References 

Educational institutions established in 1918
Public high schools in Alabama
Schools in Lee County, Alabama
1918 establishments in Alabama